Andrew Carwood  (born 30 April 1965) is the Director of Music at St Paul's Cathedral in London and director of his own group, The Cardinall's Musick.

Biography
He was educated at The John Lyon School, Harrow and was a choral scholar in the Choir of St John's College, Cambridge under  George Guest, a lay clerk at Christ Church, Oxford and Westminster Cathedral, London before holding the post of Director of Music at the London Oratory Church in London for five years. He is now Artistic Director of The Cardinall's Musick and Director of Music at St Paul's Cathedral in London.

Career
As a singer he is particularly known for his performances of the English repertoire, from consort songs by William Byrd to the role of the Male Chorus in Benjamin Britten’s The Rape of Lucretia and for music of the Baroque. He has performed with many of the leading British ensembles both on disc and on the concert platform throughout the world, including the Tallis Scholars, the Orlando Consort, the Oxford Camerata and Pro Cantione Antiqua, and has undertaken solo roles for George Guest, Sir Roger Norrington, Joshua Rifkin, Harry Christophers, Richard Hickox, Paul McCreesh, Stephen Darlington, Philippe Herreweghe, Robert King and Christopher Hogwood. His discography includes works by Hassler, Vivaldi, Purcell, Haydn, Warlock, Grainger, Howells, Poulenc, Janáček and Christopher Headington. He is represented by Rayfield Artists.

As a conductor he also works with The Cardinall’s Musick and together they have performed throughout the United Kingdom and Europe. With them he has made over thirty recordings of renaissance music and now records for Hyperion Records. He is an expert on music of the 16th and 17th centuries and has worked as guest conductor with The Sixteen, The King’s Consort and the BBC Singers.

He was the Music Advisor for the National Theatre’s 2001 production of Luther by John Osborne, and in 1995, 2006 and 2007 he won the Gramophone Early Music Award. He is Director of the Schola Cantorum at the annual Edington Festival and was made an Associate of the Royal School of Church Music in 2005. In 2007 he was appointed Principal Guest Conductor of the BBC Singers. In 2010 he once again won the Gramophone Award for Early Music and the Gramophone Record of the Year Award.

He was appointed to succeed Malcolm Archer as Director of Music at St Paul's Cathedral, London, taking up the post in September 2007, the first non-organist to hold the post since the 12th century.

Carwood was appointed Member of the Order of the British Empire (MBE) in the 2022 New Year Honours for services to choral music.

References

External links
  St Paul's Cathedral
 The Cardinall's Musick
  Rayfield Allied

Living people
Alumni of St John's College, Cambridge
British performers of early music
English choral conductors
British male conductors (music)
English tenors
People educated at The John Lyon School
1965 births
21st-century British conductors (music)
21st-century British male musicians
Members of the Order of the British Empire